Harold Crosby may refer to:

 Harold B. Crosby (1918–1996), president of the University of West Florida and president of Florida International University
 Harold Ellsworth Crosby (1899–1958), American architect
 Harold J. Crosby (1886–1920), composer and arranger

See also 
 Harry Crosby (disambiguation)